State Route 26 (SR 26) is a state highway in the U.S. state of California, running from State Route 99 in Stockton in San Joaquin County to State Route 88 near Pioneer in Amador County. The highway is routed to serve Mokelumne Hill and West Point in Calaveras County.

Route description
The route begins at an interchange with SR 99 in eastern Stockton. SR 26 then exits Stockton after crossing a canal and heads eastward. After crossing Jack Tone Road, the direction of the highway turns slightly more northeasterly. The road then briefly enters the city of Linden, before intersecting Escalon-Bellota Road. Following another intersection with Jenny Lind Road, the route enters the city of Rancho Calaveras. It turns slightly more northeastward as it passes through the area. The highway passes by the New Hogan Lake before entering Valley Springs. Here, the route makes an abrupt right turn onto SR 12. The route run concurrent and turn back northeastward as they exit Valley Springs. Shortly after exiting the city limit, SR 26 veers away from SR 12 and heads north. East of Paloma, the roadway meets Paloma Road and again turns northeastward. At Mokelumne Hill, the route intersects SR 49, taking a slightly more winded path. SR 26 enters and exits the city of West Point before making an extremely long hairpin turn. Heading westward, the route enters Amador County to its terminus at SR 88. 

SR 26 is part of the California Freeway and Expressway System, and in the Stockton city limits is part of the National Highway System, a network of highways that are considered essential to the country's economy, defense, and mobility by the Federal Highway Administration. The segment between the community of Mokelumne Hill and West Point is named the Stephen P. Teale Highway, after the state senator. The bridge crossing the Middle Fork of the Mokelumne River, near West Point, is named the Tom Taylor Bridge, after a Calaveras County Supervisor.

History
CA 26 was formerly known as California State Route 8 in 1934–1964.  It bears no relation to the pre-1964 highway in Southern California that today is Interstate 10.

Major intersections

See also

References

External links

 Caltrans: Route 26 highway conditions
 California Highways: Route 26
California @ AARoads.com - State Route 26

State Route 026
State Route 026
State Route 026
026